The list of Boeing 717 operators lists both former and current operators of the aircraft.

Current operators
As of February 2023, there are 104 Boeing 717-200 aircraft in service with three airlines.

Former operators

References

717
Boeing 717